Álvaro Alexánder Recoba Rivero (born 17 March 1976; nickname "El Chino") is a Uruguayan former footballer who played as a forward or midfielder. Although he began and ended his footballing career in his native country, he also played for several European clubs throughout his career, most notably Italian side Inter Milan, where he spent 11 seasons.

At international level, Recoba won 68 caps for the Uruguay national team between 1995 and 2007, participating at the 2002 FIFA World Cup and two Copa América tournaments.

Club career

Early career
Recoba started his career with Uruguay's Danubio. After several years in the Danubio youth teams, he appeared on the first team at age 17 and played for two full seasons, 1994–95 and 1995–96. At the start of the 1996–97 season, Danubio agreed to transfer Recoba to Nacional. The following season, Nacional agreed to send Recoba to Italy's Serie A club Inter Milan.

Inter Milan
Recoba made his Inter debut on the same day as Ronaldo, on 31 August 1997, coming on as a substitute against Brescia at the San Siro. He scored two goals in the last ten minutes of the match: one, a powerful 30-yard shot that flew past the keeper, the next, a free-kick into the top corner after a Cristiano Doni foul. The goals allowed Inter to come back and win the match 2–1.

Loan to Venezia
After two seasons with Inter, Recoba was loaned out to relegation-battling Venezia for the second round of the 1998–99 Serie A. The striker scored 11 times and made 9 assists in 19 games. Eventually, Venezia escaped relegation that season.

Return to Inter Milan
After his tenure at Venezia, Recoba returned to Inter. In January 2001, he renewed his contract with the club until 30 June 2006. During the same month, he was accused of carrying a fake passport and lost the Italian nationality he had received in 1999. The Italian Football Federation penalised Recoba with a one-year ban, which was later reduced on appeal to four months. Overall, he played for Inter Milan for ten seasons, from 1997 to 2007.

On 16 March 2007, Recoba confirmed to Sky Italia he wanted to leave the team at the end of the 2006–07 season, citing lack of appearances with the first team. On 31 August 2007, he was loaned to Serie A club Torino, where he rejoined Walter Novellino, his previous boss at Venezia.

Torino
Recoba scored his first goal for the club in the second match of the season, a 1–1 draw with Palermo, after a good combination between himself and Alessandro Rosina. On 19 December 2007, Recoba gave a top-class performance against Roma in the Coppa Italia, scoring two excellent goals in Torino's 3–1 win. However, his performances have been disappointing due to injuries and lack of playing time; he did not make the expected impact despite a solid start to the season, and finished the season out of the club's starting 11.

Panionios
On 5 September 2008, Recoba signed for Greek top division club Panionios, where he joined Greek international and former Inter teammate Lampros Choutos as well as Uruguay national team player Fabián Estoyanoff. He made his debut in a 2–1 win against Aris on 18 October 2008. He proved his quality by assisting both goals for teammates Giannis Maniatis and Anderson Gonzaga. In his next match, Recoba inspired Panionios to a 5–2 away win against Ergotelis, where he scored two goals. He finished the season with five goals and seven assists, despite continuous fitness problems.

On 9 June 2009, Recoba agreed to remain at Panionios for the following season, as per the terms of his original contract. On 6 December 2009, and after being constantly injured, Recoba came to an agreement with the club to mutually rescind his contract on 16 December 2009. Panionios stated the termination was "friendly" and that they "were honoured" by his association with the club despite his injury-riddled spell.

Back to Uruguay

After nine days without a club, Recoba announced on 24 December 2009 that he would sign with Danubio, where he had played from 1993 to 1995.

In July 2011, Recoba signed for former club Nacional. He appeared in many matches coming on from the bench, but still helped the team to win the Torneo Apertura. Recoba  scored the second goal in the clásico victory 2–1 against Peñarol by taking a penalty kick during stoppage time. The result allowed Nacional to surpass Peñarol in the tournament table. He also scored the only goal in the last game against Liverpool.

During the Torneo Clausura, he started more matches, scoring the third and definitive goal of that tournament's clásico, which ended ending 3–2 for Nacional.

He scored the only goal in the final game of 2011–12 Campeonato Uruguayo against Defensor Sporting Club on 16 June 2012.

During the Uruguayan Clásico on 9 November 2014, at almost age 38, Recoba scored a 30-yard free-kick in the fifth minute of stoppage time to win the match for Nacional.

International career
Recoba made his debut for Uruguay on 18 January 1995 in a friendly match against Spain (2–2) at the Estadio Riazor, A Coruña, replacing Enzo Francescoli in the 65th minute. He played at the 2002 FIFA World Cup. His only goal at the tournament came against Senegal in Uruguay's final group stage match, but it was not enough as the match finished in a 3–3 draw and eliminated Uruguay in the first round.

In September 2005, Recoba scored the winning goal against Argentina in a 2006 World Cup qualifying match. This helped Uruguay qualify as South America's fifth-placed team and put them in position to play for the intercontinental play-off against Oceania Football Confederation champions Australia. However, Uruguay lost 4–2 in a penalty shootout after a draw in aggregate score. Recoba was substituted off in the second leg of the playoff for Marcelo Zalayeta after 73 minutes. When he was interviewed for the Australian documentary November 16 in 2015, Recoba indicated his displeasure at the decision to replace him, saying, "I was OK. I had the will to keep going. I was disappointed to come off in a game like that."

After the 2006 World Cup, and despite his lack of appearances in Inter's playing squad, Recoba was again picked for the Uruguay national team. He scored his 12th international goal in a 2–1 victory on 2 June 2007, in a friendly against Australia and he also appeared for Uruguay in the 2007 Copa América, where Uruguay finished fourth. In total, Recoba was capped 69 times with Uruguay.

Retirement
Recoba played his last match as a professional footballer on 31 March 2016 at age 40, at the Estadio Gran Parque Central in Montevideo. The occasion was an exhibition game, organized by Nacional, between one  team of current and former Nacional players, with Hugo de León, Felipe Revelez, "Cacique" Medina, among others, and a team of Amigos del Chino which included international stars Juan Román Riquelme, Christian Vieri, Carlos Valderrama, Juan Sebastián Verón and Iván Zamorano.

Style of play
A quick, technically gifted and creative offensive midfield playmaker, who was capable both of scoring and creating goals, Recoba's main strengths were his dribbling skills, ball control, pace, his brilliant long passing and crossing ability and his powerful and accurate striking ability with his left-foot from outside the area. He was a set-piece, penalty kick, and corner-kick specialist, renowned for his curling free-kicks, and has scored goals of great quality, examples of which were his two goals on his debut with Inter. Recoba was capable of playing in several offensive positions, and has been used as an attacking midfielder, as a supporting striker, and as a winger. For a period, he was also the highest-paid footballer in the world. Despite his talent, Recoba was often injury-prone throughout his career, and was also criticised for his poor work-rate and inconsistency, which has led pundits and managers to accuse him of not fulfilling his potential.

Personal life
Recoba's son Julio is also a footballer.

Career statistics

Club

International

International statistics
Source:

International goals
Source:

Scores and results list Uruguay's goal tally first. Score column indicates score after each Recoba goal.

Honours
Inter Milan
Serie A: 2005–06, 2006–07
Coppa Italia: 2004–05, 2005–06
Supercoppa Italiana: 2005, 2006
UEFA Cup: 1997–98

Nacional
Uruguayan Primera División: 2011–12, 2014–15

References

External links

 International statistics at rsssf
 Profile at Tenfield 
 FootballDatabase provides Álvaro Recoba's profile and stats
 

1976 births
Footballers from Montevideo
Living people
Association football forwards
Uruguayan footballers
Uruguay international footballers
Uruguayan expatriate footballers
Uruguayan expatriate sportspeople in Italy
Expatriate footballers in Italy
Expatriate footballers in Greece
Danubio F.C. players
Club Nacional de Football players
Inter Milan players
Venezia F.C. players
Torino F.C. players
Panionios F.C. players
Serie A players
1997 Copa América players
1997 FIFA Confederations Cup players
2002 FIFA World Cup players
2007 Copa América players
Super League Greece players
Uruguayan Primera División players
UEFA Cup winning players